Alcyonidiidae is a family of bryozoans belonging to the order Ctenostomatida.

Genera:
 Alcyonidioides d'Hondt, 2001
 Alcyonidium Lamouroux, 1813
 Bockiella Silén, 1942
 Demafinga Cuffey, Dodge & Skema, 2014
 Halodactyle Farre
 Halodactylus Farre, 1837
 Lobiancopora Pergens, 1889
 Paralcyonidium Okada, 1925
 Syringothenia Obut, 1953

References

Bryozoan families